Ida May Park (December 28, 1879 – June 13, 1954) was an American screenwriter and film director of the silent era, in the early 20th century. She wrote for more than 50 films between 1914 and 1930, and directed 14 films between 1917 and 1920. She was born and died in Los Angeles, California. She was married to film director and producer Joseph De Grasse, with whom she was regularly teamed at Universal.

Early career
Park got her start in the entertainment industry as a stage actress when she was 15 years old. During her time in the theatre she met her future husband, Joseph De Grasse, also an actor. When Pathé hired De Grasse in 1909, Park was hired as a writer. Together they were hired by Universal.

Work at Universal

The first screenplay that she wrote was titled A Gypsy Romance which was developed into a short scenario by director Wallace Reid. Reid also directed the next scenario that she wrote, The Man Within. Park then started to work with De Grasse who directed the next several pieces that she wrote. The two worked on multiple shorts and scenarios together over several years. Their first joint project was the short Her Bounty (1914), and their first feature-length film was Father and The Boys (1915). Most of the titles that the two worked on together were for Universal's Bluebird label. Park made her solo directorial debut in 1917 when she directed The Flashlight starring Universal's top dramatic actress Dorothy Phillips; after this picture, she and DeGrasse took turns directing Bluebird projects featuring Phillips. She went on to direct 13 more films, many of which were deemed "women's features".

Park and De Grasse continued at Universal Studios until 1919 when they left for unknown reasons.

Later career
After leaving Universal, Park directed The Butterfly Man (1920), starring Lew Cody, followed by two independent feature-length films co-directed with her husband, Bonnie May and The Midlanders (both 1920). These were the latter of Park's directorial credits. De Grasse continued to direct for a few more years, and Park continued to write for the screen. She wrote an additional two films before she left the industry altogether. The last feature film that she wrote was The Playthings of Hollywood (1931) for Willis Kent Productions.

Ida May Park died in Los Angeles on June 13, 1954, at age 74.

Selected filmography

 Her Bounty (1914)
 All for Peggy (1915)
 The Grind (1915)
 The Girl of the Night (1915)
 Steady Company (1915)
 Bound on the Wheel (1915)
 Mountain Justice (1915)
 Alas and Alack (1915)
 A Mother's Atonement (1915)
 Lon of Lone Mountain (1915)
 The Millionaire Paupers (1915)
 Father and the Boys (1915)
 Dolly's Scoop (1916)
 The Grip of Jealousy (1916)
 Tangled Hearts (1916)
 The Gilded Spider (1916)
 Bobbie of the Ballet (1916)
 The Grasp of Greed (1916)
 If My Country Should Call (1916)
 The Place Beyond the Winds (1916)
 The Price of Silence (1916)
 The Piper's Price (1917)
 Bondage (1917)
 Hell Morgan's Girl (1917)
 The Girl in the Checkered Coat (1917)
 The Flashlight (1917), also directed
 Fires of Rebellion (1917), also directed
 The Rescue (1917), also directed
 The Model's Confession (1918), also directed
 Broadway Love (1918), also directed
 Bread (1918), also directed
 The Grand Passion (1918), also directed
 The Vanity Pool (1918), also directed
 Bonnie May (1920), co-directed only
 The Midlanders (1920), also directed
 The Butterfly Man (1920)
The Hidden Way (1926)
 Playthings of Hollywood (1930)

Selected bibliography
 "Male (Vamp) and Female (Director)," brief photo-illustrated profile of Lew Cody and Ida May Parks [sic], Photoplay, May 1920, p. 44.
Koszarski, Richard. 1976. Hollywood Directors: 1914-1940. Oxford University Press. Library of Congress Catalog Number: 76-9262.

References

External links

"The Motion-Picture Director", essay by Park written for the book Careers for Women (1920)

American women screenwriters
American women film directors
1879 births
1954 deaths
Writers from Los Angeles
Film directors from Los Angeles
Women film pioneers
Screenwriters from California
20th-century American women writers
20th-century American screenwriters